Francisco Javier González de Castejón y Elío (25 May 1848 - 25 November 1919) was a Spanish lawyer and politician who served as Minister of Justice during the regency of Maria Christina of Austria, and served as Minister of Development and Minister of the Interior during the reign of Alfonso XIII. He also served as the Solicitor General of Spain.

Biography 

He was born on 25 May 1848 in Pamplona. He was a professor of natural law at the Complutense University of Madrid.

He served as Minister of Justice between 18 April 1900 and 6 March 1901 during the premierships of Silvela and Azcarraga, he served again between 27 October 1913 and 7 September 1914 during the premiership of Dato. He served as Minister of Development from 6 December 1902 to 20 July 1903 and from 27 January to 23 June 1905. He was also Minister of the Interior from 16 December 1904 to 27 January 1905.

He was a member of the Royal Academy of Jurisprudence and Legislation and of the Academy of Moral and Political Sciences.

Orders 

 Knight Grand Cross of the Order of Isabella the Catholic. (Kingdom of Spain)
 Knight Grand Cross of the Order of St. Gregory the Great. (Holy See)
 Knight Grand Cross of the Order of Saint Michael. (Kingdom of Bavaria)

References

Bibliography

External links 

19th-century Spanish politicians
1848 births
1919 deaths
Knights Grand Cross of the Order of St Gregory the Great
Knights Grand Cross of the Order of Isabella the Catholic
Members of the Senate of the Spanish Restoration